The Italian Socialist Party of Proletarian Unity (Partito Socialista Italiano di Unità Proletaria, PSIUP) was a political party in Italy, active from 1964 to 1972.

History
The PSIUP was formed on 12 January 1964 by a leftist section of the Italian Socialist Party (PSI). PSIUP had been the PSI's name in 1943–1947. The new PSIUP was led by Tullio Vecchietti. Other leading members were Lelio Basso, Vittorio Foa, Lucio Libertini, Emilio Lussu, Francesco Cacciatore detto Cecchino and Dario Valori.

The new party attracted PSI militants who were dissatisfied with the close cooperation between the PSI and the Christian Democracy. Instead the founders of the PSIUP favoured cooperation with the Italian Communist Party (PCI).

On 13 July 1972, following a disappointing electoral result, the PSIUP split. The majority, led by Libertini, Valori and Vecchietti, joined the PCI. The rightist minority, led by Giuseppe Avolio, Nicola Corretto and Vincenzo Gatto, rejoined the PSI. The leftist minority, led by Foa and Silvano Miniati, continued to work under the name PSIUP, and in December 1972 they established the Proletarian Unity Party (PdUP).

A Posadist faction within the PSIUP published the Bollettino della sinistra rivoluzionaria del PSIUP between 1965 and 1967.

Electoral results

Italian Parliament

Secretaries
 Tullio Vecchietti (January 1964 – September 1971)
 Dario Valori (October 1971 – July 1972)

See also 
Giuseppe Impastato, anti-mafia journalist member of the party, assassinated on May 9, 1978

External links
Lelio Basso, The Italian Left, "Socialist Register", 1966.

1964 establishments in Italy
1972 disestablishments in Italy
Defunct socialist parties in Italy
Political parties disestablished in 1972
Political parties established in 1964